Kenton Patzkowsky is an American politician. He is a Republican who represents District 61 in the Oklahoma House of Representatives.

Political career 

In 2018, Patzkowsky ran for the District 61 seat in the Oklahoma House of Representatives; former representative Casey Murdock had won a seat in the State Senate. Patzkowsky and Brad Raven advanced to a runoff for the Republican nomination, which Patzkowsky won. He went on to win the general election with 70.4% of the vote.

Patskowsky is running for re-election in 2020, and is facing Kenny Bob Tapp in the Republican primary. In April, Patskowsky argued to the Oklahoma State Election Board that Tapp should be disqualified due to the state residency requirement. Tapp admitted that he spends 90% of his nights in Colorado, but the board allowed him to continue his candidacy.

As of June 2020, Patzkowsky sits on the following committees:
 Utilities (Vice Chair)
 Agriculture and Rural Development
 A&B Natural Resources and Regulatory Services
 Transportation

Electoral record

References 

Living people
Republican Party members of the Oklahoma House of Representatives
Year of birth missing (living people)
21st-century American politicians